João is a 1991 album by João Gilberto.

Reception 
Allmusic awarded the album 4 stars.

Track listing 
 "Eu Sambo Mesmo" ("I Really Samba") (Janet Almeida)
 "Siga" ("Go On") (Fernando Lobo, Helio Guimarães)
 "Rosinha" ("Little Rose") (Jonas Silva)
 "Málaga" (Fred Bongusto)
 "Una Mujer" ("A Woman") (Paul Misraki, S. Pontal Riso, C. Olivare)
 "Eu e Meu Coração ("My Heart and I") (Inaldo Vilarinho, Antonio Botelho)
 "You Do Something to Me" (Cole Porter)
 "Palpite Infeliz" ("Unhappy Remark") (Noel Rosa)
 "Ave Maria no Morro" ("Ave Maria on the Hill") (Herivelto Martins)
 "Sampa" (Caetano Veloso)
 "Sorriu pra Mim" ("Smiled at Me") (Garoto, Luiz Claudio)
 "Que Reste-t-il de Nos Amours" ("I Wish You Love") (Charles Trenet, Leon Chauliac)

Personnel 
 Joao Gilberto – voice, guitar
 Clare Fischer – keyboards, string and woodwind arrangements
 Jim Hughart – acoustic bass
 Joe Correro – drums
 Michito Sanchez – percussion

References 

1991 albums
João Gilberto albums